Violette Athletic Club is a professional football club based in Port-au-Prince, Haiti.

History

Violette is one of the most successful clubs in the country. In 1939, Violette A.C. captured the double after winning the league and the Coupe d'Haïti. They were awarded the 1984 CONCACAF Champions' Cup following the disqualification of two teams who had been planned to play a two-legged series to determine the North American participant in the final. The club was relegated to second division after the 2016 Ligue Haïtienne season.

The club has produced many Haitian international footballers, including Alexandre Boucicaut and Sebastien Vorbe. Their home stadium, Stade Sylvio Cator, was damaged during the 2010 earthquake and later reopened for use.

Violette won the 2021 Série d'Ouverture and qualified for the 2022 Caribbean Club Championship, which they won while playing all of their home matches at Estadio Cibao FC in Santiago de los Caballeros, Dominican Republic, due to the ongoing political crisis. They qualified for the 2023 CONCACAF Champions League and scheduled several friendlies to prepare for the competion, as the Ligue Haïtienne had suspended operations for the 2022 season. Violette earned an upset 3–0 victory over Austin FC, a Major League Soccer club from the United States, in the Round of 16's first leg in the Dominican Republic. Due to issues obtaining enough travel visas for the second leg in the United States, Violette temporarily signed several players from the lower leagues of U.S. soccer to serve as bench players. The team arrived in the United States with 14 total players—avoiding a forfeit—and lost 2–0 to retain their 3–2 aggregate lead and advance to the quarterfinals.

Honours
Ligue Haïtienne: 7
 1939, 1957, 1968, 1983, 1994/95, 1999, 2020/21-O

Coupe d'Haïti: 2
 1939, 1951

CONCACAF Champions' Cup: 1
 1984

CFU Club Championship: 1
 2022

International competitions
CONCACAF Champions League: 7 appearances
1969 – First Round – Lost against  Somerset Trojans 6–1 on aggregate (stage 1 of 3)
1975 – First Round (Caribbean) – Withdrew against  SV Transvaal (stage ? of ?)
1977 – Third Round (Caribbean) – Lost against  SV Robinhood 1–0 on aggregate (stage 3 of 5)
1984 – CONCACAF Champion
1985 – Unknown results
1994 – First Round (Caribbean) – Lost against  CRKSV Jong Colombia 2–1 on aggregate (stage 2 of 7)
 2023 – TBD

CFU Club Championship: 4 appearances
2000 – First Round - Group B - 2nd place - 6 pts (stage 1 of 2)
2002 – Second Round - Group A - 2nd place - 4 pts (stage 2 of 2)
2009 – Semifinal Lost against  Puerto Rico Islanders 2–0 - Lost Third Place Round against  San Juan Jabloteh 1–2
2022 – Caribbean Champions

Crests

Current squad

List of coaches
 Antoine Tassy
 Philippe Vorbe
 Kênelt Thomas
 Georges Emmanuel
 Ralph Kernisan

References

Football clubs in Haiti
Sport in Port-au-Prince
Association football clubs established in 1918
CONCACAF Champions League winning clubs